Low Chee Leong is a Malaysian politician who has served as Member of the Melaka State Legislative Assembly (MLA) for Kota Laksamana since May 2018. He served as Member of the Melaka State Executive Council (EXCO) in the Pakatan Harapan (PH) state administration under former Chief Minister Adly Zahari from May 2018 to the collapse of the PH state administration in March 2020. He is a member of the Democratic Action Party (DAP), a component party of the PH coalition.

Election results

References

External links
 

1963 births
Living people
People from Malacca
Malaysian people of Chinese descent
Democratic Action Party (Malaysia) politicians
Members of the Malacca State Legislative Assembly
Malacca state executive councillors
21st-century Malaysian politicians